Change List may refer to:

 Change List (Revision Control), the set of changes made in a single commit in a revision control system.
 Change List, an Iraqi Kurdish political party, also known as Movement for Change (Kurdish: Lîstî Gorran) or Gorran ("Change")